The Junior Field Trips series is a trilogy of point-and-click children's computer and video games released by Humongous Entertainment in conjunction with Random House. These games (in general) offered virtual tours of particular locations related to their theme, and included a game suite with virtual coloring pages, a scavenger hunt, and various other games depending upon the title. They were originally released for Windows and Macintosh computers, but were ported to Steam in April 2015. These games were written using the SCUMM engine and can thus be played on additional platforms by using ScummVM.

The series was hosted by "Buzzy the Knowledge Bug" (voiced by Jim Cissell), a blue anthropomorphic insect who provides feedback on the locations when called upon and provided narration for each of the games. The Farm and Airport titles were written by the noted programmer Deborah Todd.

Games

Let's Explore the Farm

The first game was originally released on November 22, 1994 under the "Junior Encyclopedias" brand, with an updated version released on July 27, 1995, alongside Let's Explore the Airport that revamped the user interface and added mini-games. Players visit a mixed farm and can explore the barn, animals, and crops. Available areas include a farmhouse, crop fields, an orchard, a chicken coop, and a duck pond. The farm has all of the activities and processes of a real, working farm. This includes milking a cow, collecting eggs from hens, harvesting corn, and more. Fact sheets about all the farm animals, plants, farm staff, and pieces of equipment are available. Mini-games (in Let's Explore only) include trivia, spelling quizzes, a coloring book, and an egg catching game.

Let's Explore the Airport
The second title was released on July 27, 1995, alongside Let's Explore the Farm. Players visit an airport and can explore the various airport departments and the interior of the aircraft. Other areas include the airfield, a seaplane dock, and a helipad. The airport has all the processes, procedures, services, and specifications true to reality. Fact sheets with diagrams teach about the aircraft, airport staff, and machinery. Mini-games include trivia, object quizzes, object finding, a coloring book, and a lost luggage game.

Let's Explore the Jungle
The third title was released on November 14, 1995. Players visit three different types of rainforests: South American, African, and Southeast Asian. Fact sheets about animal types and behavior, plants, places, and geographical objects are available. Mini-games include trivia, letter jumble, object finding, a coloring book, and an anteater feeding game.

Accolades

See also
 Humongous Entertainment
 ScummVM

References

External links
 
 Junior Field Trips at Humongous Entertainment

1994 video games
Children's educational video games
Classic Mac OS games
Point-and-click adventure games
Humongous Entertainment games
ScummVM-supported games
Windows games
Video games developed in the United States
Video games set in forests